PSB may refer to:

Organisations 
 Belgian Socialist Party
 Brazilian Socialist Party
 Parti Sarawak Bersatu
 Brunei History Centre, a government body in Brunei
 Pacific Symposium on Biocomputing, an annual scientific meeting
 Paris School of Business, a private business school located in Paris
 Penn State Behrend, a commonwealth Pennsylvania State University campus in Erie, PA.
 Philippine Savings Bank
 Presidential Service Badge of the US military
 PSB Research, a market research firm (Penn Schoen Berland)
 PS Business Parks, American real estate investment trust (NYSE: PSB)
 Psychological Strategy Board, a U.S. government committee to coordinate psychological warfare
 Public Schools Branch, the English school district of Prince Edward Island, Canada
 Public Schools of Brookline, a school district of Brookline, Massachusetts, United States
 Public Security Bureau, the name for a police department in Mainland China
 Punjab & Sind Bank, Northern India (NSE: PSB)
 United Sarawak Party,, a political party in Sarawak, Malaysia

Science and medicine 
 Phosphate solubilizing bacteria
 Photosynthetic bacteria
 Protected specimen brush
 Persistent slip bands
 Purple sulfur bacteria

Technology 
 Adobe Photoshop Big (.PSB), a file format
 Polysulfide bromide battery
 Proton Synchrotron Booster, a synchrotron at CERN

Music 
 PSB Speakers, a Canadian loudspeaker company
 Public Service Broadcasting (band), a British electronic trio
 Pet Shop Boys, an English musical duo
 Plus-Tech Squeeze Box, a Japanese Shibuya-kei band

Other 
 Psychological Strategy Board, a committee set up by the Truman administration to coordinate and plan psychological operations
 Poplar Street Bridge, a bridge across the Mississippi River
 Mid-State Regional Airport (IATA airport code "PSB"), an airport in Philipsburg, Pennsylvania
 Polski Słownik Biograficzny, a Polish encyclopedia
 Public service broadcasting in the United Kingdom
  Purple sprouting broccoli, a variety of broccoli